Chlamydotheca elegans is a species of freshwater ostracods in the family Cyprididae. It is found in Colombia.

References

External links 

Cyprididae
Arthropods of Colombia
Crustaceans described in 1986